Jason Ryles (born 17 January 1979 in Wollongong, New South Wales) is an Australian former professional rugby league footballer who played in the 2000s and 2010s. A New South Wales State of Origin and Australia national representative forward, he played in the National Rugby League for the St. George Illawarra Dragons before going to the Super League and playing for French club Catalans Dragons. Ryles returned to Australia and played for the Sydney Roosters before finishing his career at the Melbourne Storm.

Playing career
In 2000, Ryles made his National Rugby League debut, playing for the St. George Illawarra Dragons. At the end of the 2001 NRL season, he went on the 2001 Kangaroo tour. In June, 2008, St. George Illawarra announced Ryles had signed with French Super League club, Catalans Dragons for two years commencing in 2009.

Ryles returned to the NRL in 2010 with the Sydney Roosters and was part of the team that made the Grand Final that season. However, after a disappointing 2011 season for the Sydney Roosters, his contract was terminated one year before its expiry. He subsequently signed with the Melbourne Storm for the 2012 season. Melbourne, who were the minor premiers in 2011, cited Ryles' experience as a major factor in his signing. He played in the Melbourne Storm's 2013 World Club Challenge win over Leeds. Ryles had played fifteen Tests for Australia and represented the New South Wales Blues on eight occasions.

Playing Highlights 
Junior Clubs: Berkeley & Wests Illawarra
First Grade Debut: Round 15, St. George Illawarra v Parramatta, Parramatta Stadium, 14 May 2000
2005 Minor Premiership winner with St. George Illawarra:

Coaching career
Ryles began his coaching career in 2012 with NSW State of Origin under 20s side as their assistant coach, which also carried over to 2013. Both years were successful in defeating Queensland's under 20s team.

After his retirement as a player in the National Rugby League Ryles accepted a head coaching role for Western Suburbs Red Devils for the 2014/2015 seasons.

At the end of 2015 Ryles was approached by Melbourne Storm to join their staffing team as assistant coach where he currently held this position until autumn 2020.

While at Melbourne Storm from 2016–present, Ryles has also periodically assisted in coaching England's national rugby union team.

In 2016 and 2017 Ryles was appointed assistant coach for Junior Kangaroos.

In autumn 2020, Ryles joined England as skills coach on a full-time basis. However he missed the 2021 Six Nations Championship due to travel restrictions relating to the COVID-19 pandemic. He left the role in May 2021.

In 2022 he joined the Sydney Roosters as an assistant coach.

References

1979 births
Living people
Australia national rugby league team players
Australian rugby league coaches
Australian rugby league players
Catalans Dragons players
Country New South Wales Origin rugby league team players
Melbourne Storm players
New South Wales Rugby League State of Origin players
Rugby league locks
Rugby league players from Wollongong
Rugby league props
Rugby league second-rows
St. George Illawarra Dragons players
Sydney Roosters coaches
Sydney Roosters players